, commonly known as TSV 1860 München (lettered as ) or 1860 Munich, is a sports club based in Munich. The club's football team currently plays in the 3. Liga, the third tier of German football. 

1860 Munich was one of the founding members of the Bundesliga in 1963, becoming West German champions in 1966, and played a total of 20 seasons in the top flight. Since their relegation from the 2. Bundesliga, 1860 Munich play their home games at the Grünwalder Stadion.

History

Origins of the club
The roots of the TSV's founding as a physical fitness and gymnastics association go back to a meeting held 15 July 1848 in a local pub, Buttlesche Brauerei zum Bayerischen Löwen. It was a time of revolutionary foment due to the 1848 Revolutions, and the club was banned in 1849 by the Bavarian monarchy for "republican activities". The club was formally reestablished on 17 May 1860 and after mergers with a number of other local associations in 1862 was known as Turnverein München. A football department was created on 6 March 1899 and played its first matches against other squads three years later.

1900–1945
In 1911, the team adopted the familiar lion to their crest and in 1919 was renamed TSV München 1860. By the mid-1920s, they were playing competitive football in the country's upper leagues, like the Bezirksliga Bayern, making a national semi-final appearance in 1927. Die Löwen challenged for the championship in 1931 but lost a 3–2 decider to Hertha BSC. Two years later, they made another semi-final appearance which they lost to Schalke 04 who were on their way to becoming the dominant side in German football through the 1930s and 1940s, both teams were supported and sponsored by the Nazi regime at the time.

In 1933, German football was re-organized under the Third Reich into 16 top-flight divisions known as Gauligen. TSV joined the Gauliga Bayern where they earned second-place finishes in 1934, 1938 and 1939 before finally capturing a division championship in 1941. Their subsequent play-off appearance saw them finish second in their pool to finalist Rapid Wien. The following season they failed to advance to the national play-off rounds, but did go on to earn their first major honours by defeating Schalke 04 to capture the Tschammerpokal, known today as the DFB-Pokal. TSV returned to the national play-offs again in 1943, progressing to the quarter-finals.

Post war
After World War II, 1860 played in the top flight Oberliga Süd as a mid-table side, suffering relegation for a period of three years in the mid-1950s. However, they delivered when it mattered most in 1963 by winning the league championship and with it automatic entry into Germany's new professional league, the Bundesliga, ahead of rivals Bayern Munich, who would have to wait two seasons for their own top flight debut since the German Football Association (DFB) did not want two teams from the same city in the new league. 1860 continued to perform well through the mid-1960s: they captured their second DFB-Pokal in 1964, played the 1965 European Cup Winners' Cup final against West Ham United – losing 2–0. In 1966, they came away as Bundesliga champions and qualified for the 1966–67 European Cup, but lost 3–2 on aggregate against Real Madrid in second round. On 3 June 1967, they finished as runners up in Bundesliga.

The 1970s, 1980s and 1990s
Those performances were followed by poor showings in three consecutive seasons leading to relegation in 1970 to the Regionalliga Süd (II). It took 1860 seven years to make their way back to the first division, through a three-game play-off contest with Arminia Bielefeld, only to be immediately relegated again. One year later they were back, this time for a two-year stay, then in 1982 they were relegated once again and then forced into the tier III Amateur Oberliga Bayern when financial problems led to the club being denied a licence.

The club's exile from the Bundesliga would last a dozen years. They were promoted to the top flight in 1994, but found themselves in immediate danger being sent back down again. President Karl-Heinz Wildmoser and manager Werner Lorant, however, made several shrewd purchases including striker Olaf Bodden, winger Harald Cerny, attacking midfielder Daniel Borimirov, playmaker Peter Nowak and defensive stoppers Miroslav Stević, Jens Jeremies and Manfred Schwabl. Stars like Abedi Pele, Thomas Häßler and Davor Šuker played for 1860 as their careers were winding down, becoming crowd favourites and making important contributions.

2000s
Under the leadership of Wildmoser and Lorant, the combination of proven veterans and young talent helped the club avoid relegation and become a decent mid-table side. 1860 earned a fourth-place Bundesliga finish in 2000 and were entered into the UEFA Champions League Third qualifying round, where they faced Leeds United. A 3–1 aggregate defeat, however, saw them play in the UEFA Cup that season, advancing to the third round where they were eliminated by Parma. The club, however, was unable to build on this success and after some mediocre performances by the team, manager Lorant was fired.

After a decade in the top division, 1860 burnt out in the 2003–04 season with a 17th-place finish that returned the club to the 2. Bundesliga. Wildmoser made the controversial decision to groundshare with hated rivals Bayern Munich in the Allianz Arena, a move that outraged fans and led to accusations of a sell-out. His downfall came when he and his son Karl-Heinz Wildmoser Jr. were caught in a bribery scandal around the awarding procedure for the contract to build the stadium.

In addition to closely being relegated to the Regionalliga Süd (III) in the 2005–06 season, 1860 experienced severe financial difficulties. Stadium partner Bayern Munich bought out TSV's 50% interest in the Allianz Arena in late April 2006 for €11 million, providing the club some immediate financial relief.  Following this move, the DFB was satisfied with the financial health of the club and duly issued 1860 a licence to play in the 2. Bundesliga for the 2006–07 season.

TSV hired several new managers during its 2. Bundesliga period. The first was Rudi Bommer, followed by Reiner Maurer, Walter Schachner, Marco Kurz and Uwe Wolf. Also, former Germany national team player Stefan Reuter as a general manager. None of the new managers, however, could lead the squad back to the top-flight Bundesliga. Ewald Lienen coached the team from 13 May 2009 to the end of the 2009–10 season.

2010–present
Reiner Maurer was hired as manager of 1860 at the start of the 2010–11 season.

1860 came close to insolvency for a second time in five years in 2011 when it needed €8 million to survive. Help was offered to the club by local rival Bayern Munich, to the disgust of the supporters of each club, since Bayern was to lose €50 million in future stadium rent if the club defaulted on its rental contract obligations until 2025. Eventually, the club was rescued by Jordanian investor Hasan Abdullah Ismaik, who, for €18 million, purchased 60% of the club's professional team's operating company, 1860 GmbH & Co. KGaA'. However his voting rights being restricted to 49% due to regulations governing German football, which is based around membership-led clubs and not entrepreneurial. H. I. Squared International, a company controlled by Ismaik, took over the marketing of the club from IMG.

The 2014–15 season saw the club finish 16th in the 2. Bundesliga. It was forced to participate in the relegation play-offs against Holstein Kiel where it retained its league place with a 2–1 home win after a 0–0 draw in the first leg. 1860 survived courtesy to an injury time goal by defender Kai Bülow in front of 57,000 spectators in Munich.

In 2016–17, the team finished 16th in the 2. Bundesliga after a 1–2 defeat against 1. FC Heidenheim in the last game of the season. They played 1–1 and 0–2 respectively in the following relegation play-off against Jahn Regensburg and were therefore officially relegated. Managing director Ian Ayre and President Peter Cassalette resigned from their positions the following day. On 2 June 2017, it was announced that 1860 were unable to obtain a 3. 
Liga licence for the 2017–18 season as a result of investor Hassan Ismaik's unwillingness to pay the necessary fees. As a result, the club was relegated to the Regionalliga Bayern for the 2017–18 season.

They spent only one season in the Regionalliga as they won the league in 2017–18, thus securing their return to the 3. Liga.

Reserve team

The TSV 1860 München second team, (previously, until 2005, the TSV 1860 München Amateure), have been historically quite successful at the Bavarian level.

The second team struggled during the club's years outside professional football, but rose through the ranks again after the club's revival in the early 1990s and returned to the Bayernliga in 1996, winning the title in its first season there and promotion to the third-tier Regionalliga Süd. The team was relegated to the Bayernliga in 2001, and returned to the Regionalliga Süd in 2004. TSV 1860 München II missed out on 3. Liga qualification in the 2007–08 season, and again in the 2012–13 season when it won the newly formed Regionalliga Bayern but lost to SV Elversberg in the promotion round. Because the first team was relegated to Regionalliga Bayern for the 2017–18 season, the reserve team was relegated to the fifth-tier Bayernliga Süd.

The club is the only one in Bavaria to have won the Bayernliga with its first and second team.

Ground

Originally, 1860 Munich played their home matches in the Stadion an der Grünwalderstraße (commonly known as Sechzgerstadion, which means "60er Stadium"). They shared this venue, built in 1911, with city rivals Bayern Munich between 1925 and 1972. Both clubs then moved to the new Olympiastadion built for the 1972 Olympic Games. 1860 Munich moved back to the old ground several times from 1972 on, with the years between 1982 and 1995 being the longest period. In the 2004/05 season 1860 again played at Sechzger as the Allianz Arena was being readied.

From 2005 to 2017, 1860 Munich played their home matches in the Allianz Arena, which they shared—and until 2006 co-owned—with Bayern Munich. The arena's usual peach lighting was changed to 1860's blue when the team played. The club's inaugural game at the Allianz Arena was a friendly played against 1. FC Nürnberg on 30 May 2005. On 28 April 2006, 1860 sold its 50% share to Bayern Munich to help resolve a serious financial crisis that saw 1860 facing bankruptcy. On 12 July 2017, Bayern Munich terminated 1860 Munich's rental agreement for Allianz Arena. The club returned to their old stadium, the Grünwalder Stadion.

Season-by-season performance
References:

Honours

League
 German championship/Bundesliga
 Champions: 1965–66
 Runners-up: 1931, 1966–67 
 Oberliga Süd (I)
 Champions: 1962–63
 Gauliga Bayern (I)
 Champions: 1940–41, 1942–43
 2. Bundesliga Süd (II)
 Champions: 1979
 Runners-up: 1977
 2. Oberliga Süd (II)
 Champions: 1955, 1957
 Bayernliga (III)
 Champions: 1984, 1990–91, 1993
Runners-up: 1986, 1990
 Regionalliga Bayern (IV)
 Champions: 2017–18

Cup
 German Cup/DFB-Pokal
 Winner: 1942, 1963–64
 Bavarian Cup 
 Winner: 2020

International
 European Cup Winners' Cup
 Runners-up: 1964–65
 Coppa delle Alpi
 Runners-up: 1967
 Tournoi de Pentecôte du Red Star
 Winners: 1927

Youth
 German Under 19 championship
 Runners-up: 1997
 German Under 17 championship
 Champions: 2006
 Runners-up: 1984
 German Under 19 Cup
 Winners: 2000, 2007
 Bavarian Under 19 championship
 Winners: 1963, 1982, 1983, 1988, 1998‡
 Runners-up: 1958, 1969, 1970, 1977, 1984, 1986
 Bavarian Under 17 championship
 Winners: 1975, 1980, 1984
 Runners-up: 1979, 1981
 Bavarian Under 15 championship
 Winners: 1979, 1980, 1997, 1998, 2012

Reserve team
 Regionalliga Bayern (IV)
 Champions: 2012–13
 Bayernliga (IV)
 Champions: 1997, 2004
 Runners-up: 2002, 2003
 Bayernliga-South (III)
 Champions: 1961
 Runners-up: 1960
 Landesliga Bayern-Süd (IV-V)
 Champions: 1996
 Runners-up: 1965, 1967, 1974, 1982
 Bezirksoberliga Oberbayern (VI)
 Runners-up: 1995

Players

Current squad

Out on loan

TSV 1860 Munich II squad

Coaches

Notable famous or former players

Sponsorship

References

External links

 

 
Association football clubs established in 1899
Sports clubs established in 1860
Multi-sport clubs in Germany
Football clubs in Germany
Bundesliga clubs
Football clubs in Munich
1860 establishments in Bavaria
2. Bundesliga clubs
3. Liga clubs